David Wilson is an English music video director and animator from Wells, Somerset, currently living in London. Wilson studied Illustration at Brighton University and did a foundation course in Art and Design at St. Martin's. He is represented by the production company Riff Raff in the UK and The Directors Bureau in the U.S. . He has directed music videos for Arcade Fire, The Maccabees, David Guetta, Arctic Monkeys and Tame Impala.

Filmography

Music videos

References

External links

David Wilson on IMVDb

Living people
English music video directors
Year of birth missing (living people)